The 2019 Judo Grand Slam Abu Dhabi was held in Abu Dhabi, United Arab Emirates from 24 to 26 October 2019.

Medal summary

Men's events

Women's events

Source Results

Medal table

References

External links
 

2019 IJF World Tour
2019 Judo Grand Slam
Judo
Grand Slam Abu Dhabi 2019
Judo
Judo